Nurul Huq (12 January 1936 – 25 January 2021) was the first chief of staff of the Bangladesh Navy. He was a Commander in the Pakistan Navy and post independence was promoted to Captain on being given the responsibility of the Bangladesh Navy. He was also chairman of BIWTA and subsequently shipping minister. He was the naval chief from 7 April 1972 to 6 November 1973.

References

1936 births
2021 deaths
Bangladeshi Navy admirals
Royal Indian Navy officers
Chiefs of Naval Staff (Bangladesh)
Pakistan Navy officers
Mukti Bahini personnel
People from Habiganj District